DeKalb Street station, formerly known as King Manor station, is a SEPTA rapid transit station in Bridgeport, Pennsylvania. It serves the Norristown High Speed Line (Route 100) and is located on Ford Street near DeKalb Street (U.S. Route 202), although SEPTA gives the address as Ford Street and Crooked Lane. All trains stop at DeKalb Street.

Originally named DeKalb Street station upon opening, the name was changed to King Manor. SEPTA reverted to the station name on September 5, 2010. The platform reflects the new name while the street sign retains the King Manor name.

Station layout

SEPTA Suburban Bus connections

References

External links

 DeKalb Street entrance from Google Maps Street View

SEPTA Norristown High Speed Line stations